Robin Carl Lodders (born 30 November 1994) is a German professional basketball player for Rasta Vechta of the German ProA.

Career
In the past, he played for the Telekom Baskets Bonn of the German Basketball League. He signed with Niners Chemnitz in 2017. He was part of the team that earned promotion to the BBL in the 2019–20 season.

On 15 July 2020 he signed with Science City Jena of the German ProA.

On 11 June 2021 he signed with Rasta Vechta of the German ProA.

References

External links
 Eurocup Profile
 German BBL Profile
 Eurobasket.com Profile

1994 births
Living people
Centers (basketball)
ETB Wohnbau Baskets players
German men's basketball players
NINERS Chemnitz players
Power forwards (basketball)
SC Rasta Vechta players
Sportspeople from Hanover
Telekom Baskets Bonn players